Henry J. Savelkoul (born July 1, 1940) is a Minnesota politician and the former Minority Leader of the Minnesota House of Representatives. A member of the Republican Party of Minnesota, he represented District 31A, which includes portions of Freeborn and Mower counties in the south eastern part of the State.

Education and career
Savelkoul graduated from St. Leo High School in Minot, North Dakota. He got his Bachelor of Arts (B.A.) degree at St. Thomas College in 1962.  Savelkoul attended University of Minnesota Law School and got his Juris Doctor (J.D.) from Harvard Law School in 1965. He got his Minnesota Bar Admission in 1965, his United States District Court for the District of Minnesota Bar Admission in 1968, and his United States Supreme Court Bar Admission in 1970. Savelkoul is an attorney at Peterson, Savelkoul, Kolker, Haedt & Benda, Ltd. (Formerly Firm of Christian, Slen, Savelkoul) in Albert Lea. He practices Business Law and Litigation, Construction Law and Litigation, Agricultural Law, Employment Law, Estate Planning, Family Law, Real Estate, and Probate/Trust Law.  Savelkoul Director of the Minnesota Institute of Continuing Legal Education (1983-1999) and Chairman of the Metropolitan Sports Facility Commission (1993-1999).

Minnesota House of Representatives

Elections
Savelkoul was first elected in 1968. He was re-elected in 1970, 1972, 1974, and 1976. He decided not to run in 1978.

Tenure
Savelkoul was sworn in on January 7, 1969.  He served in the 66th, 67th, 68th, 69th, and 70th Minnesota Legislature. He was elected the Minority Leader of the Minnesota House of Representatives from 1975-1979.

Committee assignments
For the 70th Minnesota Legislature, Savelkoul was part of:
Criminal Justice Committee
General Legislation and Veterans Affairs Committee
Rules and Legislative Administration Committee
Taxes Committee

For the 69th Minnesota Legislature, Savelkoul was part of:
Judiciary Committee
Local and Urban Affairs Committee
Rules and Legislative Administration Committee
Taxes Committee

For the 68th Minnesota Legislature, Savelkoul was part of:
Environmental Preservation and Natural Resources Committee
Judiciary Committee
Taxes Committee

For the 67th Minnesota Legislature, Savelkoul was part of:
Claims Committee
Commerce and Economic Development Committee
Education Committee
Environmental Preservation Committee
Judiciary Committee
Taxes Committee

For the 66th Minnesota Legislature, Savelkoul was part of:
Cities of the Second and Third Class Committee
Claims Committee 
Commerce and Economic Development Committee 
Crime Prevention Committee
Education Committee
Employee Compensation and Retirements Committee
Judiciary Committee

Personal life
Savelkoul is married to his wife Margaret. They have 4 kids: Tricia, Donny, John, and Richard. They reside in Albert Lea, Minnesota. His son Donny is also a lawyer.

References

External links 

|-

1940 births
Living people
Republican Party members of the Minnesota House of Representatives
People from Bottineau County, North Dakota
Harvard Law School alumni
People from Albert Lea, Minnesota
Minnesota lawyers
University of St. Thomas (Minnesota) alumni
University of Minnesota Law School alumni